Glyphodes serosalis is a moth in the family Crambidae. It was described by Paul Dognin in 1897. It is found in Ecuador (Loja Province).

References

Moths described in 1897
Glyphodes